James Rolston Lonsdale (31 May 1865 – 23 May 1921) was Unionist Member of Parliament (MP) for Mid Armagh from January 1918 until his death. He succeeded his brother John to this constituency on the latter's elevation to the Lords as Baron Armaghdale.

The son of James Lonsdale, DL, he was educated at The Royal School, Armagh and Trinity College, Dublin. In 1902 he married Maud Musker, daughter of John Musker of Shadwell Court, Norfolk.

He was appointed High Sheriff of Armagh in 1891. There is a memorial to Lonsdale  in the south aisle at St Patrick's Cathedral, Armagh.

References

External links 

1865 births
1921 deaths
People educated at The Royal School, Armagh
Alumni of Trinity College Dublin
Irish Unionist Party MPs
Members of the Parliament of the United Kingdom for County Armagh constituencies (1801–1922)
UK MPs 1918–1922
High Sheriffs of Armagh